Roberto Antonio Richeze Araquistain (born 25 October 1981) is an Argentinian cyclist. His brothers Mauro, Maximiliano and Adrián are also cyclists.

Major results
2010
1st Trophée Princier
2013
2nd Overall Vuelta a San Juan
2014
3rd Overall Vuelta a San Juan

References

1981 births
Living people
Argentine male cyclists